Zachary Dylan Smith (born November 23, 1994) is an American actor.

Biography
Smith's career began in community theatre when he was six years old.

He played Bob Gilbreth in Cheaper By the Dozen and before moving into films continued with other stage performances including ToTo in The Wizard of Oz. His break came when he was cast as the young Dale in TV production 3: The Dale Earnhardt Story (2004) and he later landed a recurring role on the TV series  One Tree Hill as young Dan. He played Brendan Hume in the feature film Death Sentence (2007) which starred Kevin Bacon.  He plays young Chase in Rex (2008) and ten-year-old Leonidas in Meet the Spartans (2008).

Filmography

References

External links
 

1994 births
Living people
American male child actors
American male film actors
American male television actors
Male actors from Columbia, South Carolina